"All I Need Is a Miracle" is a song performed by English pop rock band Mike + The Mechanics. Written by guitarist Mike Rutherford and producer Christopher Neil, it was first included on their 1985 self-titled debut album, and later released as a single in early 1986 in the USA, where it reached number 5 on the Billboard Hot 100. The song was sung by Paul Young on both the original recording and the 1996 re-recording for the band's Hits compilation album.

In an interview prior to the song's release as a single, Rutherford commented, "The thing that makes 'Miracle' different, to me, is that it's a happy song – or it's primarily a happy song. It's 'up'. And I don't do that very often. ...It may not be optimistic, but it's a positive attitude to life."

Details 
"All I Need Is a Miracle" was the second single released by Mike + The Mechanics, following "Silent Running (On Dangerous Ground)", which also reached the top 10. "All I Need Is a Miracle" featured lead vocals by former Sad Café vocalist Paul Young.

The cover of the single was twice recycled for Mike + The Mechanics albums, first for their greatest hits package Hits in 1996, and then for Mike & the Mechanics in 1999.

A new version of the song, titled "All I Need Is a Miracle '96", was included on Hits.

In 1987, the song was nominated for "Best Pop Performance By a Duo or Group" at the 29th Annual Grammy Awards Ceremony.

Reception
Cash Box said that "it has a clean, lively sound reminiscent of Alan Parsons."  Billboard said it is "upbeat and danceable."

Music video
The music video for "Silent Running (On Dangerous Ground)" ends with footage of Mike + The Mechanics performing the song at a restaurant, and segues into the video for "Miracle". In the video, "All I Need is a Miracle" is the final song in the band's fictional set, so Mike + The Mechanics' tour manager (played by Roy Kinnear) attempts to settle up with the restaurant owner (played by Victor Spinetti) for the agreed sum of £250. However, the owner points out that due to the gig being arranged at the last minute, the restaurant is more than half empty, and refuses to pay. Moreover, he threatens to hold all the band's equipment (and "the guitarist's right arm" the early airings) as collateral until he is paid £500.

The bulk of the video then alternates between the band's performance (with Paul Carrack acting as the bassist) and the manager's adventures in trying to acquire the necessary £500. The manager's conflicts get worse when a Chinese hoodlum swipes his money while riding a bike. The manager runs after the thief and follows him to the basement of a restaurant in Chinatown where his money is being gambled away. There he attempts to gamble his money back by playing mah-jong. However, as he is winning, the thief and his cronies kick him out of the building. As he sits in despair, he is consoled by a stray dog, which is soon whisked away by its owner. His luck changes when the grateful Rolls-Royce-driving owner hands him a large amount of money for "finding" the dog. The manager returns to the restaurant, pays the owner the £500, and gives the change to Rutherford, telling him to split it amongst the band. The blissfully unaware Rutherford quips the video's punch line, "That's an easy way to make a living."

Personnel 
Mike + The Mechanics
 Mike Rutherford – electric guitars, bass,  backing vocals
 Paul Young – lead vocals
 Paul Carrack – backing vocals
 Adrian Lee – keyboards
 Peter Van Hooke – drums

Additional personnel
 Dereck Austin – keyboards
 Ian Wherry – keyboards
 Alan Carvel – backing vocals
 Christopher Neil – backing vocals
 Linda Taylor – backing vocals

Chart performance

Weekly Charts

Year-end Charts

References

1985 songs
1986 singles
Mike + The Mechanics songs
Song recordings produced by Christopher Neil
Songs written by Mike Rutherford
Songs written by Christopher Neil
Atlantic Records singles
Rock ballads